Iván Emmanuel González Ferreira (born 28 January 1987, in Asunción) is a Paraguayan footballer. He was on trial at Hapoel Be'er Sheva in the Israeli Premier League in July 2009, but signed for Cerro Porteño later that month. In July 2010, he moved to the Brazilian side Atlético Paranaense.

Iván is the brother of Celso and Julio.

Career
Began speaking Guaraní football. In others, had a spell at St. Gallen in Switzerland,

Then it was a subsidiary of VfB Stuttgart. In 2006, he returned to Paraguayan football, more exactly to Olimpia of Paraguay in which he had many opportunities. In 2007 passed the Sportivo Luqueño and the second half of 2007 was to FC Wil in Switzerland where he played his best sporting achievement.

In 2009, he returned to Paraguay to the Sun of America where he participated in major tournament where he had ups and downs in income protention that deprived the opportunity to appear. And at times it has set itself made the difference. Scored the most gorgeous "Paraguayan Apertura Tournament."

In the second half of 2009 was hired by Cerro Porteno, Paraguay the ultimate champion. In 2010, he was hired by Atletico Paranaense to compete in the Campeonato Brasileiro. Atletico Paranaense acquired 50% of his passes.

Ivan is characterized by his strong kick and speed.

References

External links

1987 births
Living people
Sportspeople from Asunción
Paraguayan footballers
Paraguayan expatriate footballers
Club Guaraní players
Club Olimpia footballers
Cerro Porteño players
Sportivo Luqueño players
VfB Stuttgart II players
Club Athletico Paranaense players
América Futebol Clube (RN) players
FC St. Gallen players
FC Wil players
Club Sol de América footballers
Club Rubio Ñu footballers
Delfín S.C. footballers
Deportivo Capiatá players
Association football midfielders
Swiss Super League players
Swiss Challenge League players
Campeonato Brasileiro Série A players
Campeonato Brasileiro Série C players
Regionalliga players
Paraguayan Primera División players
Paraguayan expatriate sportspeople in Brazil
Paraguayan expatriate sportspeople in Switzerland
Expatriate footballers in Brazil
Expatriate footballers in Germany
Expatriate footballers in Switzerland